Anders Ruben Forsblom (born 24 June 1931) is a Finnish cyclist. He won the Finnish national road race title in 1953 and 1954. He also competed in the individual and team road race events at the 1952 Summer Olympics.

References

External links
 

1931 births
Living people
Finnish male cyclists
Olympic cyclists of Finland
Cyclists at the 1952 Summer Olympics
People from Porvoo
Sportspeople from Uusimaa